Altaysky District is the name of several administrative and municipal districts in Russia. The districts are named after the Altai Mountains.
Altaysky District, Altai Krai, an administrative and municipal district of Altai Krai
Altaysky District, Republic of Khakassia, an administrative and municipal district of the Republic of Khakassia

See also
Altaysky (disambiguation)

References